Sometimes You Win is the eighth studio album by Dr. Hook.

The album contains three of the band's most commercially successful singles: "When You're in Love with a Beautiful Woman" (also included on their previous album Pleasure and Pain), "Better Love Next Time" and "Sexy Eyes."

Track listing
"Better Love Next Time" (Johnny Slate, Larry Keith, Steve Pippin) – 2:59
"In Over My Head" (Dan Tyler, Eddie Rabbitt, Even Stevens) – 3:40
"Sexy Eyes" (Bob Mather, Chris Waters, Keith Stegall) – 3:30
"Oh! Jesse" (Sam Weedman) – 2:54
"Years From Now" (Charles Cochran, Roger Cook) – 3:14
"I Don't Feel Much Like Smilin'" (Dennis Locorriere, Ray Sawyer) - 2:41
"When You're in Love with a Beautiful Woman" (Even Stevens) - 3:00
"What Do You Want?" (Eddie Rabbitt, Even Stevens)  – 3:08
"Love Monster" (Sam Weedman) – 3:10
"Mountain Mary" (Ray Sawyer, Shel Silverstein)  – 2:37
"Help Me Mama" (Ray Sawyer, Shel Silverstein) – 4:02

Personnel
Dr. Hook
 Ray Sawyer - Guitar, Vocals
 Dennis Locorriere - Guitar, Vocals
 Billy Francis - Keyboards, Vocals
 John Wolters - Drums, Vocals
 Rik Elswit - Guitar, Vocals
 Jance Garfat - Bass
 Bob "Willard" Henke - Guitar, Keyboards, Vocals 
Additional musicians
Barry Beckett, Billy Puett, David Hood, Jimmy Johnson, Jon Goin, Larry Byrom, Mickey Buckins, Randy McCormick, Rod Smarr, Roger Hawkins, Shane Keister
Diane Tidwell, Lisa Silver, Sheri Kramer, The Cherry Sisters - backing vocals
The Nashville Horns - horns
The Shelly Kurland Strings - strings

Production
 Pat Holt -	Engineer
 James Cotton -	Engineer
Michael Kanarek - front cover design and illustration

Charts

References

1979 albums
Dr. Hook & the Medicine Show albums
Capitol Records albums
Albums produced by Ron Haffkine
Albums recorded at Muscle Shoals Sound Studio